The Ungava seal (Phoca vitulina mellonae) is a subspecies of harbor seal, endemic to a small series of freshwater lakes in the Ungava Peninsula, located in northern Quebec. It is noted for being one of the few examples of freshwater seals. It was thought that fewer than 100 individuals remained in 2020. The Ungava seal is currently classified by the International Union for Conservation of Nature as endangered.

References

Freshwater animals of North America
Endemic fauna of Canada
IUCN Red List endangered species
Phocins